John Fassett may refer to:
 John Fassett Jr., settler of Vermont and judge
 John Barclay Fassett, American Civil War soldier and Medal of Honor recipient